The 1956–57 FAW Welsh Cup is the 70th season of the annual knockout tournament for competitive football teams in Wales.

Key
League name pointed after clubs name.
B&DL - Birmingham & District League
CCL - Cheshire County League
FL D1 - Football League First Division
FL D2 - Football League Second Division
FL D3N - Football League Third Division North
FL D3S - Football League Third Division South
SFL - Southern Football League

Fifth round
Ten winners from the Fourth round and six new clubs.

Sixth round

Semifinal
Swansea Town and Newport County played both matches at Cardiff, Wrexham and Chester played at Rhyl.

Final
Final were held at Cardiff.

External links
The FAW Welsh Cup

1956-57
Wales
Cup